The Poole Harbour Trails comprise six linear walks that enable a complete circuit to be made of Poole Harbour on the south coast of England, which is said to be the second largest natural harbour in the world.

Description 
Poole Harbour is "a national treasure and provides access to some stunning countryside and woodland" as well as "wonderful views". The harbour and its environs are rich in wildlife and its towns and villages are "set in some of the best walking areas in South West England."

The trails consist of six linear walks making a complete circuit of this vast harbour. The walks are waymarked at key junctions. In addition there are 13 circular walks based on a viewing point or other point of interest.

Leaflets for each walk may be downloaded from the Poole Harbour Trails website.

Linear walks 
The six linear walks are:

 Walk 1 - Poole to Greenlands, 7.5 miles
 Walk 2 - Greenlands to Norden Park and Ride, 7 miles
 Walk 3 - Norden Park and Ride to Wareham, 7.5 miles
 Walk 4 - Wareham Quay to Sandford, 7.5 miles
 Walk 5b - Sandford to Turlin Moor, 8.5 miles
 Walk 5 - Future hopes for Walk 5 Sandford to Turlin Moor via Cordite Way and a new bridge
 Walk 6 - Turlin Moor to Poole Quay, 7 miles

Circular walks 
The 13 circular walks are:

 Walk 1a - Quay and Park, Poole, 3.8 miles, easy, 1hr 20 min
 Walk 1b - Poole Quay, Upton Country Park and Holes Bay, 5.5 miles, 3 hrs
 Walk 1c - Lilliput Footpaths, View Point and Evening Hill, 2.5 miles, 1-2 hrs
 Walk 2a - Greenlands Farm, Agglestone Rock and Studland, 4.5 miles, 2.5 hrs
 Walk 2b - Studland Heath, Shell Bay and Harbour's Edge, 6 miles, 3.5 hrs
 Walk 3a - Middlebere, Sharford Bridge and Wytch Farm, 4.5 miles, 2.5 hrs
 Walk 3b - Middlebere Farm and Sharford Bridge, 2.5 miles, 1.5 hrs
 Walk 3c - Middlebere, Hartland Moor, Scotland and Sharford Bridge, 6 miles, 3 hrs
 Walk 4a - Wareham station and West Mills, 4.5 miles, 2.5 hrs
 Walk 4b - Wareham station, Wareham Forest and Sika Trail, 4 miles, 2.5 hrs
 Walk 4c - Wareham Quay and Rivers Frome and Piddle, 4.5 miles, 2 hrs
 Walk 4d - Wareham Quay and Wareham Walls, 1.5 miles, 1 hr
 Walk 5a - Sandford and Organford, 5 miles, 3 hrs
 Walk 6a - Upton Country Park, Upton Heath and Roman Road, 5 miles, 3 hrs
 Walk 6b - Upton Country Park, Ham Common and Lytchett Bay, 7 miles, 3.5 hrs

References

External links 

Long-distance footpaths in Dorset
Poole Harbour